Keld Markuslund (9 July 1921 – 20 October 1972) was a Danish film actor. He appeared in 35 films between 1951 and 1973.

Selected filmography
 Vi arme syndere (1952)
 We Who Go the Kitchen Route (1953)
 Flintesønnerne (1956)
 The Girls Are Willing (1958)
 Vi er allesammen tossede (1959)
 Charles' Aunt (1959)
 Forelsket i København (1960)
 Gøngehøvdingen (1961)
 Crazy Paradise (1962)
 Der brænder en ild (1962)
 Den kære familie (1962)

External links

1921 births
1972 deaths
Danish male film actors
People from Odense Municipality
20th-century Danish male actors
1972 suicides
Suicides in Denmark